Croshaw is a surname. Notable people with the surname include:

Ben "Yahtzee" Croshaw (born 1983), British comedic writer, video game journalist, humorist, author, and video game developer
Christine Croshaw (born 1942), British pianist and music teacher
Glenn R. Croshaw (1950–2021), American politician and judge
Joseph Croshaw (1610–1667), British planter in the Colony of Virginia
Raleigh Croshaw (c. 1584 – 1624), British planter and politician in the Colony of Virginia
Unity Croshaw (c. 1636–1693), British daughter of a planter in the Colony of Virginia